Diana Ross & the Supremes: Greatest Hits Vol. 3 is a 1969 compilation album by Diana Ross & the Supremes, released on the Motown label. It features all of the hits released by the group between 1967 and 1969 save for the Supremes/Temptations duet singles. After Florence Ballard's mid-1967 departure from the group, Supremes singles were recorded by Diana Ross with session singers The Andantes on backgrounds instead of new Supreme Cindy Birdsong and founding member Mary Wilson, including "Love Child" and "Someday We'll Be Together" (Birdsong's voice in fact does not appear on this album).

Two of the singles included here, "Love Is Here and Now You're Gone" and "The Happening", were also included on Diana Ross & the Supremes: Greatest Hits. That album was a double disc release, and constituted both volumes one and two of the Supremes' greatest-hits series (hence the title of this release).

Diana Ross & the Supremes:  Greatest Hits Vol. 3 was released on compact disc.

Track listing

Side one
Superscripts denote original album sources, referenced below.
"Reflections" (Holland–Dozier–Holland) c
"Love Is Here and Now You're Gone" (Holland-Dozier-Holland) a
"Someday We'll Be Together" (Harvey Fuqua, Johnny Bristol, Jackey Beavers) f
"Love Child" (Frank Wilson, Pamela Sawyer, Deke Richards, Henry Cosby, R. Dean Taylor) d
"Some Things You Never Get Used To" (Nickolas Ashford, Valerie Simpson) d
"Forever Came Today" (Holland-Dozier-Holland) c

Side two
"In and Out of Love" (Holland-Dozier-Holland) c
"The Happening" (Holland-Dozier-Holland, Frank De Vol)  b
"I'm Livin' in Shame" (Wilson, Sawyer, Richards, Cosby, Taylor) e
"No Matter What Sign You Are" (Berry Gordy, Cosby) e
"The Composer" (Smokey Robinson) e

Album sources
a from The Supremes Sing Holland–Dozier–Holland (1967)
b from Diana Ross & the Supremes: Greatest Hits (1967)
c from Reflections (1968)
d from Love Child (1968)
e from Let the Sunshine In (1969)
f from Cream of the Crop (1969)

Personnel
Diana Ross: lead vocals
Mary Wilson and Florence Ballard: background vocals on "Love Is Here and Now You're Gone", "In and Out of Love", and "The Happening"
Maxine and Julia Waters: background vocals, "Someday We'll Be Together"
The Andantes: background vocals on "Love Child", "Forever Came Today", "In and Out of Love", "I'm Livin' in Shame", "No Matter What Sign You Are", "The Composer"
Johnny Bristol: producer and background vocals on "Someday We'll Be Together"
Nickolas Ashford & Valerie Simpson: producers and backing vocals, "Some Things You Never Get Used To"
Berry Gordy, Henry Cosby, Frank Wilson, Deke Richards, and R. Dean Taylor: producers, "Love Child" and "I'm Livin' in Shame"
Berry Gordy & Henry Cosby: producers, "No Matter What Sign You Are"
Smokey Robinson: producer, "The Composer"
Brian Holland and Lamont Dozier: producers, "Reflections", "Love Is Here and Now You're Gone", "Forever Came Today", "In and Out of Love", "The Happening"
The Funk Brothers: instrumentation on all tracks save for "Love Is Here and Now You're Gone" and "In and Out of Love".

Charts

Weekly charts

Year-end charts

References

1969 greatest hits albums
Albums produced by Johnny Bristol
Albums produced by Berry Gordy
Albums produced by Deke Richards
Albums produced by Brian Holland
Albums produced by Lamont Dozier
The Supremes compilation albums
Motown compilation albums
Albums produced by Ashford & Simpson
Albums produced by Henry Cosby
Albums produced by Frank Wilson (musician)
Albums produced by R. Dean Taylor